Conway is a census-designated place and an unincorporated area in Orange County, Florida, United States. The population was 13,467 at the 2010 census. It is part of the Orlando–Kissimmee–Sanford, Florida Metropolitan Statistical Area.

Settled in the 1850s, Conway was an important place in the early 1900s. One of the first five paved highways built in Orange County was the brick Conway Road from Orlando to Conway, running along what is now Briercliff Drive, Curry Ford Road, and Conway Road, ending at Anderson Road, the center of Conway.

Geography
Conway is located at  (28.497814, -81.333131).

According to the United States Census Bureau, the CDP has a total area of 9.4 km2 (3.6 mi2), of which 8.9 km2 (3.5 mi2) is land and 0.4 km2 (0.2 mi2) (4.70%) is water.

Demographics

As of the census of 2000, there were 14,394 people, 5,267 households, and 4,034 families residing in the CDP.  The population density was 1,610.9/km2 (4,171.7/mi2).  There were 5,414 housing units at an average density of 605.9/km2 (1,569.1/mi2).  The racial makeup of the CDP was 90.20% White; 2.56%  African American; 0.29%  Native American; 1.97%  Asian; 0.06%  Pacific Islander, 2.67% from other races; and 2.26% from two or more races.  Hispanic or Latino of any race were 11.54% of the population.

There were 5,267 households, out of which 36.9% had children under the age of 18 living with them, 61.6% were married couples living together, 11.0% had a female householder with no husband present, and 23.4% were non-families. 17.2% of all households were made up of individuals, and 6.5% had someone living alone who was 65 years of age or older.  The average household size was 2.73 and the average family size was 3.08.

In the CDP, the population was spread out, with 26.5% under the age of 18, 6.5% from 18 to 24, 30.9% from 25 to 44, 24.2% from 45 to 64, and 12.0% who were 65 years of age or older.  The median age was 38 years. For every 100 females, there were 96.7 males.  For every 100 females age 18 and over, there were 92.8 males.

The median income for a household in the CDP was $53,509, and the median income for a family was $59,205. Males had a median income of $40,510 versus $31,429 for females. The per capita income for the CDP was $23,538.  About 4.1% of families and 5.0% of the population were below the poverty line, including 5.8% of those under age 18 and 5.2% of those age 65 or over.

References

Unincorporated communities in Orange County, Florida
Census-designated places in Orange County, Florida
Greater Orlando
Census-designated places in Florida
Unincorporated communities in Florida
Neighborhoods in Orlando, Florida